K. Ravindran (1945–2011), better known by his pen-name Chintha Ravi, was an Indian writer, journalist, film critic and film director.

Biography
Born in Kannadikkal in Kozhikode as the son of Kunnummal Krishnan and Lakshmi, Ravindran studied at Kozhikode Malabar Christian School, Malabar Christian College, and did a journalism course at the Bharatiya Vidya Bhavan in Mumbai. He started his sojourn into literature with Athiranippookkal a children's book published by National Book Stall. He was only a pre-degree student then. Although he was not too politically active during his school and college days, Ravindran's association with reading rooms and libraries with Leftist leanings led him to the path of discussion and thought. He began his professional writing career with Searchlight where cinema was a specific subject of his words. He soon joined Communist Party of India's ideological journal Chintha and later became a member of the editorial board of the weekly, which earned him the pen-name Chintha Ravi. He also worked for a while with the Kalakaumudi weekly. His association with Kalakaumudi led him to the world of travelogues with "Ente Yathrakal". As a writer, he is best known for his travelogues like Swiss Sketchukal, Akalangalile Manushyar and Buddha Patham. Akalangalile Manushyar (Men in Distant Places) was the result of his journeys to remote villages of India. Buddha Patham not only focused on India, but also his tours abroad, including the heart of Europe. He also made the first television travelogue Ente Keralam, that visualised Kerala's natural and cultural features by touring every nook and cranny of the state. Ente Keralam won the Kerala Sahitya Akademi Award for Best Travelogue. His Cinemayude Rashtreeyam, a book on art criticism and cinema, won the Kerala State Film Award for Best Book on Cinema in 1990.

He debuted as a director with the Telugu film Harijan. His film Ore Thooval Pakshikal (1988), featuring music by G. Aravindan, won many accolades including the Kerala State Film Award for Best Film. He also directed several documentaries including the national award-winning Maunam Sowmanasyam, a documentary on G. Aravindan. His films were inspired by the Neo-Gramscianist theories. He also acted a small part in P.A. Backer's Kabani Nadi Chuvannappol (1975).

His visual travelogue serial entitled Ente Keralam was telecast in Asianet for many years. Ravi traveled even to the remote villages of Kerala for this programme.

Chintha Ravi died on 4 July 2011, aged 65, at a private hospital in Thrissur. He was under treatment for lung cancer.
He is survived by wife N Chandrika, daughter of writer Devaki Nilayangode, and son Thathagathan, an anthropology research scholar in the University of Texas.

Bibliography
 Travelogues
 Akalangalile Manushyar
 Digaruvile Aanakal
 Swiss Sketchukal
 Mediterranean Venal
 Vazhikal Vyakthikal Ormakal
 Budhapatham
 Seethakala Yathrakal
 Ente Yathrakal
 Raveendrante Yathrakal (collection of all travelogues)

 Others
 Athiranippookkal
 Kadine Nokkumbol Ilakale Kannunnathu
 Antonio Gramsci
 Cinemayude Rashtreeyam
 Kalavimarsam: Marxist Manadandam

Filmography
 Harijan Iniyum Marichittillatha Nammal (1980)
 Ore Thooval Pakshikal'' (1988)

References

External links
 
 Chintha Ravi at the British Film Institute Movie Database
 Profile of Chintha Ravi at Cinemaofmalayalam.net

1945 births
2011 deaths
Deaths from lung cancer
Indian film critics
Journalists from Kerala
Malayalam film directors
Writers from Kozhikode
Indian male film actors
Indian Marxist journalists
Malayalam screenwriters
Malayalam-language writers
Kerala State Film Award winners
Recipients of the Kerala Sahitya Akademi Award
Malabar Christian College alumni
20th-century Indian journalists
Indian travel writers
Film directors from Thrissur
20th-century Indian dramatists and playwrights
Screenwriters from Kerala
20th-century Indian film directors
Malayalam film producers
Film producers from Kerala